The second competition weekend of the 2015–16 ISU Speed Skating World Cup was held in the Utah Olympic Oval in Salt Lake City, United States, from Friday, November 20, until Sunday, November 22, 2015.

There were six world records over the course of the weekend. On Friday, Pavel Kulizhnikov of Russia shaved another 2/100 off his 500 m world record from the previous weekend. On Saturday, Ted-Jan Bloemen of Canada unexpectedly beat Dutchman Sven Kramer's 10000 m world record from 2007 with more than five seconds, and American Heather Richardson-Bergsma beat compatriot Brittany Bowe's 1500 m world record from the weekend before.

On Sunday, Bowe responded by taking back her 1000 m world record, which she had lost to Richardson the previous weekend. Additionally, both the men's and the women's team sprint records, established only the weekend before, were beaten.

Multiple winners were Kulizhnikov, who won both 500 m races and the 1000 m race, and Zhang Hong of China, who won both women's 500 m races and the team sprint.

Schedule
The detailed schedule of events:

All times are MST (UTC−7).

Medal summary

Men's events

 In mass start, race points are accumulated during the race. The skater with most race points is the winner.

Women's events

 In mass start, race points are accumulated during the race. The skater with most race points is the winner.

Standings
The top ten standings in the contested cups after the weekend. The top five nations in the team sprint cups.

Men's cups

500 m

1000 m

1500 m

5000/10000 m

Mass start

Team sprint

Grand World Cup

Women's cups

500 m

1000 m

1500 m

3000/5000 m

Mass start

Team sprint

Grand World Cup

References

 
2
Isu World Cup, 2015-16, 2
Sports in Salt Lake City
2015 in sports in Utah